The Madhvani Group of Companies commonly referred to as the Madhvani Group, is one of the largest conglomerates in Uganda.  The group has investments in Kenya, Uganda, Rwanda, South Sudan, Tanzania, the Middle East, India, and North America.

History

In 1912, Muljibhai Madhvani, then aged 18, arrived in Jinja following his older brother Nanjibhai.  Starting in 1914, he was able to join his 
brothers small trading concern and help create a business that would later account for 10 percent of Uganda's gross domestic product. Following the Asian expulsion of 1972 Muljbhai's five sons decided to split parts of the business equally.  His workers and their dependents have enjoyed free education, housing, and healthcare under the Group. The Group's businesses are run primarily by Madhvani family members, but many of the newer investments are joint ventures with other businesses.

During the 1970s, the Madhvani family was expelled from Uganda by Idi Amin and their businesses were nationalized and mismanaged to near-extinction. In 1985, the family returned to Uganda and with loans from the World Bank, the East African Development Bank, and the Uganda Development Bank, they resurrected and rehabilitated their businesses and started new ones.

Muljibhai Madhvani Foundation
The Muljibhai Madhvani Foundation is a charitable trust that was established in 1962, just before Uganda gained its independence, to honor the vision of Muljibhai Madhvani (14 May 1894 – 11 July 1958). The foundation awards scholarships to deserving undergraduate and postgraduate university students to study in Ugandan universities. One of the foundation's primary objectives is to maintain and promote scientific and technical education among the people of Uganda.

Subsidiary companies
The Madhvani Group includes but is not limited to the following companies:
 Chobe Safari Lodge, Murchison Falls National Park, Uganda
 East African Packaging Solutions, Njeru, Uganda – now sole owner after buying out partner
 East African Distributors Limited – furniture and hardware merchandising, Kampala, Uganda 
 East African Glass Works Limited – Defunct
 Excel Construction Limited, Jinja, Uganda and Juba, South Sudan 
 East African Underwriters Limited – 51 percent shareholding by Liberty Holdings Limited of South Africa Kampala, Uganda
 Industrial Security Services Limited, Jinja, Uganda
 Kabuye Sugar Works, Kabuye, Rwanda
 Kajjansi Roses Limited, Kajjansi, Wakiso District, Uganda
 Kakira Airport, Kakira, Uganda
 Kakira Power Company, Kakira, Uganda – the owner-operators of Kakira Power Station
 Kakira Sugar Works, Kakira, Uganda – the flagship company of the Group
 Kakira Sugar Works Hospital, Kakira, Uganda
 Silver Back Lodge, Bwindi Forest, Uganda
 Kakira Sweets & Confectioneries Limited, Kakira, Uganda
 Liberty Life Assurance Uganda Limited, Kampala, Uganda
 Madhvani Group Central Purchasing, Jinja, Uganda
 Madhvani Group Projects Limited, Kampala, Uganda
 Madhvani Group Steel Division – Jinja Uganda
 Marasa India Resorts and Hotels, Rajkot, Gujarat, India
 Madhvani Properties Limited, Kampala, Uganda
Makepasi Match Limited Jinja, Uganda – the largest producers of wax safety matches in Africa
 Marasa Holdings Limited, Kampala, Uganda
 Muljibhai Madhvani Foundation, Kakira, Uganda
 Mwera Tea Estate, Mityana District, Uganda
 Mweya Safari Lodge, Queen Elizabeth National Park, Uganda
 Nakigalala Tea Estate, Wakiso District, Uganda
 Paraa Safari Lodge, Murchison Falls National Park, Uganda
 Premier Safaris Limited, Jinja, Uganda
 Software Applications Uganda Limited, Kampala, Uganda
 Madhvani Group Steel Division, Jinja, Uganda
 TPSC Turbo Prop Service Centre Uganda Limited, Aircraft Maintenance, Kakira, Uganda
 Umabano Hotel – Kigali Rwanda
 Marasa Africa – Holding company for all hotels and safari lodges in Uganda, Kenya and Rwanda.

References

External links

Official Website

 
Financial services companies established in 1914
Conglomerate companies established in 1914
1914 establishments in Uganda
Jinja District